Colpidium is a genus of ciliates.

References

Further reading 

 
 

Oligohymenophorea
Ciliate genera